William Van Muse (born April 7, 1939) was the President of the University of Akron from 1984 to 1992, of Auburn University from 1992 to 2001, and Chancellor of East Carolina University from 2001 to 2003.

Biography
William Muse was born in Mississippi. He received a B.S. in accounting from Northwestern State University in Louisiana, followed by an MBA and Ph.D. in Business and Administration from the University of Arkansas. He taught at Georgia Tech and Ohio University. He served as Dean of the business schools at Appalachian State University, the University of Nebraska at Omaha, and Texas A&M University. He also served as Vice-Chancellor at Texas A&M. He then served as the President of the University of Akron from 1984 to 1992, of Auburn University from 1992 to 2001, and Chancellor of East Carolina University from 2001 to 2003. In 2007, he worked with Michigan State University on a Kettering Foundation fellowship.

He has served as the International President of Tau Kappa Epsilon fraternity, Chairman of the Akron Regional Development Board, Director of National City Bank, President of the Southeastern Conference (SEC), Director of Southtrust Bank, the Alabama Power Company, and the American Cast Iron Pipe Company. He serves as the Vice-Chair of the United Way Foundation of Greater Cincinnati. He sits on the Board of the TKE Education Foundation. He is also an elected member of the National Issues Forums Institute.

References

Living people
People from Mississippi
Northwestern State University alumni
University of Arkansas alumni
Georgia Tech faculty
Ohio University faculty
Texas A&M University faculty
Presidents of the University of Akron
Presidents of Auburn University
Presidents of East Carolina University
1939 births